Pedro Henrique Alves Santana (born 31 January 2001), known as Pedro Henrique, is a Brazilian professional footballer who plays as a defender for Bulgarian First League club Beroe, on loan from Ludogorets Razgrad.

Professional career
Pedro Henrique made his professional debut with Internacional in a 1-0 Campeonato Gaúcho win over Juventude on 23 January 2020. On 12 January 2023 he joined Beroe until end of the season, on loan from Ludogorets Razgrad.

References

External links
 
 Internacional profile 

2001 births
Living people
People from Maceió
Brazilian footballers
Brazilian expatriate footballers
Association football defenders
Campeonato Brasileiro Série A players
Chilean Primera División players
Sport Club Internacional players
Sport Club do Recife players
Unión La Calera footballers
PFC Ludogorets Razgrad II players
Brazilian expatriate sportspeople in Chile
Expatriate footballers in Chile
Sportspeople from Alagoas